Paul and Win Grace, now known as Paul Fotsch and Win Grace, were a married duo of American folk musicians and old-time musicians.  They released seven albums between 1984 and 2006 and toured extensively across North America. They performed with daughters Leela and Ellie Grace as The Grace Family.  They also performed music of the Lewis and Clark voyage with 3 other musicians, including Bob Dyer, as the Discovery String Band.  

The couple divorced in 2009 and now perform as solo artists. Win Grace plays accordion, guitar, autoharp, piano, and Le Pied (a seated form of clogging). Paul Fotsch plays fiddle, mandolin, guitar, and harmonica.

External links
Grace Family Music homepage

American folk musical groups